The 1947 Georgia Tech Yellow Jackets football team was an American football team represented the Georgia Institute of Technology in the Southeastern Conference (SEC) during the 1947 college football season. In its third season under head coach Bobby Dodd, Georgia Tech compiled a 10–1 record (4–1 against SEC opponents), finished second in the SEC, was ranked No. 10 in the final AP Poll, and outscored all opponents by a total of 240 to 49. The team played three games against ranked opponents, losing to No. 14 Alabama and defeating No. 9 Duke and No. 12 Kansas, the latter in the 1948 Orange Bowl on New Year's Day.

Georgia Tech shut out seven of eleven opponents and allowed an average of only 4.5 points per game, the third lowest among major college teams during the 1947 season.

Tackle Bob Davis was a consensus first-team pick for the 1947 College Football All-America Team. Five Georgia Tech players were honored by the Associated Press (AP) or the United Press (UP) on the 1947 All-SEC football team: Davis (AP-1, UP); guard Bill Healy (AP-1, UP); halfback Allen Bowen (AP-3); end George Broadnax (AP-3); and center Louis Hook (AP-3).

The team played its home games at Grant Field in Atlanta.

Schedule

References

Georgia Tech
Georgia Tech Yellow Jackets football seasons
Orange Bowl champion seasons
Georgia Tech Yellow Jackets football